This article is a list of diseases of apricots (Prunus armeniaca).

Bacterial diseases

Fungal diseases

Nematodes, parasitic

Viral diseases

includes uncharacterized graft-transmissible pathogens [GTP]

Graft-transmissible pathogens [GTP]

Phytoplasmal diseases

Miscellaneous diseases or disorders

References
Common Names of Diseases, The American Phytopathological Society

 Apricot
Apricot
Disease